Fatos Arapi (July 19, 1930 – October 11, 2018) was an Albanian poet, short story writer, translator and journalist. Arapi's publications have been highly praised by his readers and his peers and have been awarded various national and international poetry prizes. In 2008 Arapi became the first Albanian poet to win the Golden Wreath Award (Struga Poetry Evenings Award).

Early life
Arapi was born in 1930 in Zvërnec, Vlorë. He studied economics in Sofia, Bulgaria from 1949 to 1954, then worked as a journalist in Tirana.

Career
Arapi was a professor of History and Philology at the University of Tirana.

Arapi was a pioneer of free verse and experimental poetry in 1960s Albanian literature. He wrote about the maritime universe. He authored more than twenty-five books including six poetry collections and many short stories and novels. He translated the works of Sappho, Pablo Neruda and Nikola Vaptsarov into Albanian. He was the editor-in-chief of two anthologies: Songs of the Peoples and Anthology of Turkish Verse.

Arapi made his debut in published poetry in the second half of the fifties, and in 1962 and 1966 he published two poetry collections, Poetic Paths and Poems and Verses. Later came Rhythm of Iron, Give me a name, Gloria Victis and Solar Eclipse. Arapi was also known for his versatile prose. He wrote several novels, including Wild Geese, Snow Cove, and Headless Genius. He was also the editor-in-chief of two anthologies: Songs of the People and Anthology of Turkish Verse.

Death
Arapi died on 11 October 2018.

Works

Poetry
Shtigjet poetike (Poetic Paths), 1962
Poema dhe vjersha (Poems and Verses), 1966
Ritme të hekura (Rhythms of Iron), 1968
Më jepni një emër (Give Me A Name), 1972 (later banned by Enver Hoxha's regime)
Gloria victis, 1997
Eklipsi i endrrës (Solar Eclipse), 2002

Short stories
Patate të egra (Sour Potatoes), 1970
Dikush më buzëqeshte (Someone Was Smiling At Me), 1972
Gjeniu pa kokë (Headless Genius), 1999

Plays
Partizani pa emër (The Anonymous Partisan), 1962
Qezari dhe ushtari i mirë Shvejk (Caesar and the Good Soldier Švejk), 1995

References

1930 births
2018 deaths
Albanian male short story writers
Albanian short story writers
21st-century Albanian writers
20th-century Albanian poets
21st-century Albanian poets
Albanian journalists
Albanian translators
Albanian dramatists and playwrights
Struga Poetry Evenings Golden Wreath laureates
People from Vlorë
20th-century short story writers
21st-century short story writers
20th-century male writers
21st-century male writers
Academic staff of the University of Tirana
20th-century translators